Bainghen is a commune in the Pas-de-Calais department in the Hauts-de-France region of France.

Geography

Population

Sights
 The ruins of a feudal chateau.
 The church of St. Martin, dating from the eighteenth century.

See also
Communes of the Pas-de-Calais department

References

Communes of Pas-de-Calais